Crown Street may refer to
Crown Street, Sydney, Australia
Crown Street, Wollongong, Australia
Crown Street railway station, a defunct railway station in Liverpool, UK